NA-93 Chiniot-I is a constituency for the National Assembly of Pakistan. It comprises Lalian Tehsil, the city of Chenab Nagar and a majority of Bhowana Tehsil. The constituency was formally known as NA-88 (Jhang-III) before the 2018 delimitations. The creation of Chiniot District in 2009 from areas previously included in Jhang District mandated this change in nomenclature.

Members of Parliament

2018-2022: NA-99 Chiniot-I

Election 2002 

General elections were held on 10 Oct 2002. Faisal Saleh Hayat of PPP won by 76,201 votes.

Election 2008 

General elections were held on 18 Feb 2008. Faisal Saleh Hayat of PML-Q won by 72,197 votes.

Election 2013 

General elections were held on 11 May 2013. Ghulam Bibi Bharwana of PML-N won by 87,002 votes and became the  member of National Assembly.

Election 2018 

General elections were held on 25 July 2018.

See also
NA-92 Bhakkar-II
NA-94 Chiniot-II

References

External links
 Election result's official website

NA-088